The 2011 Nigerian House of Representatives elections in Kwara State was held on April 9, 2011, to elect members of the House of Representatives to represent Kwara State, Nigeria.

Overview

Summary

Results

Asa/Ilorin West 
PDP candidate Mustafa Moshood won the election, defeating other party candidates.

Baruten/Kaiama 
PDP candidate Zakari Mohammed won the election, defeating other party candidates.

Edu/Moro/Patigi 
PDP candidate Aliyu Ahman-Pategi won the election, defeating other party candidates.

Ekiti/Isin/Irepodun/Oke-ero 
PDP candidate Aiyedun Olayinka Akeem won the election, defeating other party candidates.

Ilorin East/South 
PDP candidate Ali Ahmed won the election, defeating other party candidates.

Offa/Oyun/Ifelodun 
PDP candidate Rafiu Adebayo Ibrahim won the election, defeating other party candidates.

References 

Kwara State House of Representatives elections
2011 elections in Nigeria